Serge Dikilu Bageta (born 24 March 1978 in Kinshasa) is a Congolese former footballer who last played for Free State Stars F.C.

Career
He joined Ajax CT in 2003, having previously played for DC Motema Pembe and Tout Puissant Mazembe. Since joining the club, Bageta has played a key role in the centre of the Ajax defence. He has recently been linked with a transfer to several European clubs. He left 2008 Ajax and joined to South African league rival Maritzburg United.

International career
The defender is a capped Congolese international.

Notes

1978 births
Living people
Footballers from Kinshasa
Association football defenders
Democratic Republic of the Congo footballers
Democratic Republic of the Congo international footballers
2000 African Cup of Nations players
2002 African Cup of Nations players
Democratic Republic of the Congo expatriate footballers
Expatriate soccer players in South Africa
Cape Town Spurs F.C. players
Democratic Republic of the Congo expatriate sportspeople in South Africa
Maritzburg United F.C. players
TP Mazembe players
Daring Club Motema Pembe players
Free State Stars F.C. players
21st-century Democratic Republic of the Congo people